FilGoal.com  (In the Goal) is an Egyptian sports website, owned and managed by Sarmady (a subsidiary of Vodafone Egypt),  FilGoal's main scope is football news.

Coverage
FilGoal covers the Egyptian, Saudi and European leagues, as well as the UEFA Champions League, Africa Cup of Nations, the FIFA World Cup and other international competitions. It provides over 20 news pieces a day beside opinion pieces and interviews with both players and coaches. With services ranging from streaming web radio commentary and analysis, visitors' own analysis section, match previews and reviews.

FilGoal.com is published in Arabic and English. The 1st version of FilGoal logo was created in 2001 by Mostafa Farahat.

References

External links
Official Website
Sarmady Website
FilGoal.com Arabic
FilGoal.com English
Football Live Stream
Vodafone Egypt 

Association football websites
Egyptian sport websites